Cascade is the fifth studio album by English musician Peter Murphy. It was released on 11 April 1995, through Atlantic and Beggars Banquet Records. Produced by Pascal Gabriel, it is Murphy's last album on Beggars Banquet and first album not to feature his backing band, The Hundred Men, which disbanded after Holy Smoke tour.

Murphy embarked a five-week joint North American tour in 1995 with American singer Jewel in support of Cascade and Jewel's debut album, Pieces of You.

Critical reception

Ned Raggett of AllMusic was positive in his assessment of the album. Raggett wrote: "Another step further up in Murphy's continuing embrace of generally positive, inspiring work, Cascade shows him once again not repeating himself." He also stated: "With a slightly quirky Statham keyboard loop starting things out, it develops from a minimal vocal/electric guitar combination into a huge, skybound declaration of love and devotion. It's Murphy at his most commanding and passionate, and the band's brilliant performance doesn't let up a jot." CMJ reviewer Chris Molanphy described the album as "the sort of stuff MTV used to play after midnight five years ago – groovy, inoffensive, unfashionable and kinda stupid. As guilty pleasures go, you could do a lot worse."

Track listing

Personnel
 Peter Murphy – vocals, lyrics, cover concept

Additional musicians 
 Anna Ross – backing vocals
 Gary Twigg – bass
 Geoff Dugmore – drums
 Kevin Armstrong – guitar
 Michael Brook – infinite guitar
 Paul Statham – guitar, keyboards, programming

Other personnel
 Pascal Gabriel – production, programming
 Pete Schwier – mixing, engineering
 Shamil Agun – cover art
 Sevil Sert – photography
 Eric Tims – photography
 Stephen Webbon – design

Chart positions
Album

References

External links
 
 

1995 albums
Peter Murphy (musician) albums
Beggars Banquet Records albums
Atlantic Records albums
Albums produced by Pascal Gabriel